Tvrtkovići is a village in the municipality of Višegrad, Bosnia and Herzegovina. It is around 60 km east of Sarajevo.

References

Populated places in Višegrad